Following are the results of the 2007 Heineken Open singles competition.  

Jarkko Nieminen was the defending champion, but he lost in the first round to Olivier Rochus.David Ferrer defeated Tommy Robredo 6–4, 6–2 to claim the title.

Seeds

Draw

Finals

Section 1

Section 2

References

External links
 Association of Tennis Professionals (ATP) – 2007 Men's Singles draw
 – 2007 Men's Qualifying draw

Singles